Thomas Young Fitzpatrick (September 20, 1850 – January 21, 1906) was an American lawyer and politician who served two terms as a U.S. Representative from Kentucky from 1897 to 1901.

Biography 
Born near Prestonsburg, Kentucky, Fitzpatrick attended the common schools.
He studied law.
He was admitted to the bar in 1877 and practiced.
County judge in 1874 and 1875.
He served as member of the State house of representatives in 1876 and 1877.
County attorney 1880-1884.

Congress 
Fitzpatrick was elected as a Democrat to the Fifty-fifth and Fifty-sixth Congresses (March 4, 1897 – March 3, 1901).

Death 
He died in Frankfort, Kentucky, January 21, 1906.
He was interred in Frankfort Cemetery.

References

1850 births
1906 deaths
Burials at Frankfort Cemetery
Kentucky lawyers
Democratic Party members of the Kentucky House of Representatives
People from Floyd County, Kentucky
Democratic Party members of the United States House of Representatives from Kentucky
19th-century American politicians